St Adalbert Cemetery is a Roman Catholic cemetery located in Niles, Illinois. It is bordered by Milwaukee Avenue on the east, Albion and Hayes Streets on the south, and Harlem Avenue on the west. Various non-cemetery properties separate it from Touhy Avenue on the north. It is intersected at its center from north to south by Newark Avenue. Its main entrance is on Milwaukee Avenue, approximately midway between Devon and Touhy.

History
The cemetery is named for Saint Adalbert, the patron saint of Poland.
The Mary, Mother of God Garden Crypt Complex was opened in 1990 in the northwest corner of the cemetery.  It contains approximately 6,000 crypts.

Notable burials

Chronologically ordered by year of death.
 Anthony Michalek (1878–1916) US Congressman
 Stanley Henry Kunz (1864–1946) US Congressman
 William Walter Link (1884–1950) US Congressman
 Leo Paul Kocialkowski (1882–1958) US Congressman
 Thomas S. Gordon (1893–1959) US Congressman
 William Lelivelt (1884–1968) Major League Baseball pitcher
 Fredrak Fraske (1872–1973) Last surviving veteran of the Indian Wars
 George Halas (1895–1983) Owner, founder, coach of the Chicago Bears
 Stanisław Błaszczak (1901–1983) Lieutenant colonel of the Polish Army, Warsaw Uprising insurgent
 Chester A. Chesney (1916–1986) US Congressman
 Dan Rostenkowski (1928–2010) US Congressman
 Steven F. Kordek (1911–2012) pinball game designer

References

External links
 
 

Cemeteries in Cook County, Illinois
Roman Catholic cemeteries in Illinois
1872 establishments in Illinois
Niles, Illinois